Adam de Kingston D.D. was Dean of St Patrick's Cathedral, Dublin from 1348 until 1353. Almost nothing else seems to be recorded of him.

References

Deans of St. Patrick's Cathedral, Dublin
14th-century Irish Roman Catholic priests